Rob Crane is an American sailor. He competed at the 2012 Summer Olympics in the Men's Laser class.

References

1986 births
Living people
American male sailors (sport)
Olympic sailors of the United States
Sailors at the 2012 Summer Olympics – Laser
Sportspeople from Stamford, Connecticut